Paul Stevenson (born 3 May 1966) is an Australian badminton player. He competed in the mixed doubles tournament at the 1996 Summer Olympics.

References

External links
 

1966 births
Living people
Australian male badminton players
Olympic badminton players of Australia
Badminton players at the 1996 Summer Olympics
Sportspeople from Bendigo
Medallists at the 1994 Commonwealth Games
Commonwealth Games medallists in badminton
Commonwealth Games bronze medallists for Australia